Network management is the process of administering and managing computer networks. Services provided by this discipline include fault analysis, performance management, provisioning of networks and maintaining quality of service. Network management software is used by network administrators to help perform these functions.

Technologies
A small number of accessory methods exist to support network and network device management. Network management allows IT professionals to monitor network components within large network area. Access methods include the SNMP, command-line interface (CLI), custom XML, CMIP, Windows Management Instrumentation (WMI), Transaction Language 1 (TL1), CORBA, NETCONF, and the Java Management Extensions (JMX).

Schemas include the Structure of Management Information (SMI), WBEM, the Common Information Model (CIM Schema), and MTOSI amongst others.

See also 

 Application service management
 Business service management
 Capacity management
 Comparison of network monitoring systems
 FCAPS
 In-network management
 
 Integrated business planning
 Network and service management taxonomy
 Network monitoring
 Network traffic measurement
 Out-of-band management
 Systems management
 Website monitoring

References

External links 
 
 
 Network Monitoring and Management Tools
 Software-Defined Network Management